Butts is an unincorporated community in eastern Crawford County, in the U.S. state of Missouri. The community is on the north side of Henpeck Hollow about one-half mile east of Courtois Creek. Access is via a county road from Missouri Route 8, approximately five miles east of Elayer. The location is within the Mark Twain National Forest and a campground is located on the Courtois River to the west of the site.

History
A post office called Butts was established in 1902, and remained in operation until 1954. The community has the name of the local Butts family.

References

Unincorporated communities in Crawford County, Missouri
Unincorporated communities in Missouri